Yeh Chu-lan (born 1949) is a Taiwanese politician. She served as acting mayor of Kaohsiung and Vice Premier of the Republic of China.

Career
Yeh worked in advertising for seventeen years prior to entering politics after her husband, Cheng Nan-jung, a dissident, chose to commit suicide rather than be arrested in 1989.

In 1992, she was the deputy convener of the Democratic Progressive Party (DPP) Caucus in Legislative Yuan, and convener in 1995. From 2000 to 2002, Yeh was third in the Cabinet in her position as Minister of Transportation and Communications. She was Chairperson of the Council for Hakka Affairs from 2002 to 2004. In 2004 she was named Vice Premier, as well as Minister of Consumer Protection and Minister responsible for the Council for Economic Planning and Development. In late 2005, she became the first female acting mayor of Kaohsiung when then-mayor Frank Hsieh was appointed Premier.

She was sworn in as the Presidential Office secretary-general in August 2007. es1"/>

Yeh was amongst the front runners to serve as DPP 2008 presidential candidate Frank Hsieh's vice-presidential running mate, however former Premier and DPP Chairman Su Tseng-chang was eventually chosen for the role.

In 2017, she was elected chairwoman of the Taiwan Visitors Association.

References

1949 births
Living people
Taiwanese politicians of Hakka descent
Mayors of Kaohsiung
Democratic Progressive Party Members of the Legislative Yuan
Fu Jen Catholic University alumni
Politicians of the Republic of China on Taiwan from Miaoli County
Taipei Members of the Legislative Yuan
Party List Members of the Legislative Yuan
Members of the 2nd Legislative Yuan
Members of the 3rd Legislative Yuan
Members of the 4th Legislative Yuan
Taiwanese Ministers of Transportation and Communications
Recipients of the Order of Brilliant Star
Women mayors of places in Taiwan
Women government ministers of Taiwan
21st-century Taiwanese women politicians